Havva Mammadova (born 1958) is a historian, professor and an Azerbaijani politician who served as the Member of National Assembly of Azerbaijan from the 122nd Khankendi electoral district.

Early life
Mammadova was born in 1958 in Barda, Azerbaijan. She graduated from Khankendi Pedagogical University in 1980 and Academy of Public Administration in 1992. Mammadova has a PhD in History.
In 1980-1990, she worked as a teacher at a secondary school in Stepanakert. When Azerbaijani community of Khankendi was expelled from the city, Mammadova became the internally displaced person within Azerbaijan. Since 1993, she has taught History at Academy of Public Administration in Baku.

Political career
Mammadova was elected to the National Assembly of Azerbaijan from the 122nd Khankendi electoral district during 2005 parliamentary elections.
She did not run for re-election in 2010 elections for unknown reasons. Flora Gasimova replaced Havva Mammadova after receiving 55.1% of votes in 2010 elections.

As a native of Karabakh, Mammadova has done a lot of work with Azerbaijani refugees and IDPs. She had travelled to Georgia, United States, Europe to attend events related to Karabakh and meet with Azerbaijani diaspora. In 2006, Mammadova along with Nizami Bahmanov and Elman Mammadov formally founded the Azerbaijani Community of Nagorno-Karabakh Social Union in exile, representing the Azerbaijani community of Nagorno-Karabakh in negotiation talks.
She's an author of three books on Nagorno-Karabakh conflict, including Khojaly: martyrs and princes: Armenian terrorism as an integral part of international terrorism

Mammadova is a member of Women Refugees Network. She is also Baku representative of newspaper New Europe.

Selected works
 Khodjaly : Martyrs and witnesses : Armenian terrorism as an integral part of the international one , 2005
 Azärbaycan xalq cümhuriyyäti dövründä Yuxarı Qarabağda siyasi väziyyät : Ermäni terrorizminin güclänmäsi (1918-1920), 2006
 The Khodjaly genocide, 2009

See also
Cabinet of Azerbaijan
Azerbaijani Community of Nagorno-Karabakh
Women in Azerbaijan
Nizami Bahmanov

References 

1958 births
Living people
People from Barda, Azerbaijan
21st-century Azerbaijani women politicians
21st-century Azerbaijani politicians
Members of the National Assembly (Azerbaijan)
Women members of the National Assembly (Azerbaijan)
Academic staff of the Academy of Public Administration (Azerbaijan)
Azerbaijani women academics
20th-century Azerbaijani historians
21st-century Azerbaijani historians
Women historians
21st-century Azerbaijani women writers